Portrait of Lotte is a time-lapse viral video involving a girl growing from a newborn in 1999 into a teenager. It was first posted by filmmaker Frans Hofmeester from Utrecht, Netherlands on 17 April 2012.

It has reached widespread and the video was used on a Sprint commercial.

Vince 
After 12 years of recording Lotte, Hoffmeester started recording videos of his son, Vince.

He described Lotte's video as being more "sweet" and Vince's as more "playful".

Background 
Hoffmeester recorded 15 second videos every week of his daughter, Lotte, from a newborn to a teenager and compiled them together to make a time-lapse video. He calls it "the ultimate coming of age time-lapse". He has done several videos of her being recorded to different ages, such as 12, 14, 16, 18 and 20 years old.

Hofmeester explains, "She was changing at such a rapid pace, that I felt the need to document the way she looked, to keep my memories intact".

Commenting on the occasions he found it difficult to get the footage required, he said, "Sometimes they did not feel like it. Then I said, 'Just one minute. Tell me about your ball game, did you win?' That way I stalled them so I could complete the shot".

References 

Viral videos
Dutch short films